Paul Leroy Porter (born August 20, 1962) is an American gospel musician. He started his solo music career, in 2008, with the release of, A New Day, that was released by Light Records. His second album, F.R.E.E., was released in 2014, with the backing of Motown Gospel releasing the project. These albums both charted on the Billboard Gospel Albums chart.

Early life
Porter was born on August 20, 1962, as Paul Leroy Porter, to father Reverend Eddie Porter and mother, Ora Porter. He grew up in Detroit, Michigan, and started singing at the age of three on Easter Sunday. He is a cousin of rapper and producer, Denaun Porter, better known as Kon Artis of the rap group D12.

Music career
He was a part of The Christianaires, who were founded in the late 1980s by him and his brother along with his cousins. He departed the group to start his solo career in 2008, with the release of A New Day on September 30, 2008, by Light Records. This album charted on the Billboard Gospel Albums chart at No. 21. Cross Rhythms' rated the album an eight out of ten. His subsequent album, F.R.E.E., was released by Motown Gospel on September 2, 2014. The album charted on the Gospel Albums chart at No. 33.

Discography

References

External links
 Official website

1962 births
Living people
African-American songwriters
African-American Christians
Musicians from Detroit
Songwriters from Michigan
21st-century African-American people
20th-century African-American people